Prasophyllum bagoense, commonly known as the Bago leek orchid, is a species of orchid endemic to a small area of southern New South Wales. It has a single tubular, green leaf and up to thirty scented, pale tawny green flowers on a flowering stem. It grows in subalpine grassland in a single population near Tumbarumba.

Description
As with others in the genus, the flowers are inverted so that the labellum is above the column rather than below it. Flowering occurs from December to January, usually after fire the previous summer.

Taxonomy and naming
Prasophyllum bagoense was first formally described in 2000 by David Jones from a specimen collected in the Bago State Forest and the description was published in The Orchadian. Jones originally gave the name P. bagoensis but the name was changed to comply with the International Code of Nomenclataure.

Distribution and habitat

Conservation
Prasophyllum bagoense is classified as "Critically Endangered" (CR) under the Australian Government Environment Protection and Biodiversity Conservation Act 1999 (EPBC Act) and as "Endangered" under the New South Wales Government Threatened Species Conservation Act 1995. The main threats to the species are changes to due to changing drainage pattern, grazing by domestic stock, disturbance by feral pigs and horses, four-wheel-driving, trail bike and horse riding and weed invasion.

References

External links 
 

bagoense
Flora of New South Wales
Endemic orchids of Australia
Plants described in 2000